Exitianus exitiosus, the gray lawn leafhopper, is a species of leafhopper in the family Cicadellidae.

Subspecies
These two subspecies belong to the species Exitianus exitiosus:
 Exitianus exitiosus angustatus DeLong & Hershberger 1947
 Exitianus exitiosus pallidens DeLong & Hershberger 1947

References

External links

 

Chiasmini
Articles created by Qbugbot
Insects described in 1880